The National Reserve Bank of Tonga (NRBT) is the central bank of Tonga. The Reserve Bank is responsible for regulating the issue and supply of domestic and international currency, as well as promoting monetary stability and economic development. It also advises the Ministry of Finance on banking and monetary matters, acts as the principal banker and fiscal agent of the Government of Tonga, and is responsible for the licensing and supervision of financial institutions. The current Governor is Ngongo Kioa.

NRBT is active in promoting financial inclusion and is a member of the Alliance for Financial Inclusion.

NRBT Building hosts the Embassy of Japan.

NRBT Is the current tallest building in Tonga, standing at 18m (59 ft).

History
National Reserve Bank of Tonga was established on 1 July 1989. It was preceded as monetary authority and holder of foreign reserves by Bank of Tonga, which was established in 1974.

Governors
 Governor of the bank is appointed for renewable five-year terms.
 Alan E. Gee, July 1989 - July 1991
 Siosiua 'Utoikamanu, July 1991 – May 2003
 Siosi Cocker Mafi, May 2003 – July 2013
 Sione Ngongo Kioa, August 2013 — October 2022
 Tatafu Moeaki, December 2022 — present

See also
Minister of Finance (Tonga)

References

External links
NRBT official website

Tonga
Economy of Tonga
Banks of Tonga
1989 establishments in Tonga
Banks established in 1989